Louis Lurvink (born 24 January 2002) is a Swiss footballer who plays as a defender for Schaffhausen.

Club career
Lurvink made his professional debut with Basel in a 0–0 Swiss Super League tie with Luzern on 3 August 2020.

On 28 January 2022, Lurvink joined Schaffhausen until the end of the season, with an option to extend.

References

External links
 
 SFL Profile
 SFV U18 Profile

2002 births
Living people
Footballers from Basel
Swiss men's footballers
Switzerland youth international footballers
Association football defenders
FC Basel players
FC Schaffhausen players
Swiss Super League players
Swiss Promotion League players